The Dragon Waiting: A Masque of History is a 1983 fantasy novel by American writer John M. Ford. It won the 1984 World Fantasy Award for Best Novel.

Plot summary
The novel is a fantasy alternate history combining vampires, the Medicis, and the convoluted English politics surrounding Edward IV and Richard III.  The book also fictionalizes the fate of the Princes in the Tower.

Edward IV is on the throne of England, but in this alternate world, medieval Europe is dominated by the threat from the Byzantine Empire. During the 4th century CE, Julian the Apostate reigned longer than he did in our world, succeeded in displacing Christianity and reintroduced religious pluralism within the Roman Empire, resulting in the subsequent disappearance of Islam as well. Without any cohesive threat from the east, presumably Byzantium was able to survive, consolidate its authority and expand.

Sforza, the Vampire Duke, marshals his forces for his long-planned attack on Florence, and Byzantium is on the march. Gregory, a mercenary, Dimi, the exiled heir to the Byzantine throne; Cynthia, a young physician forced to flee Florence, and Hywel, a Welsh wizard, nephew of Owain Gly Dwr, seem to have no common goals but together they wage an intrigue-filled campaign against the might of Byzantium, striving to secure the English throne for Richard, Duke of Gloucester, and make him Richard III.

This succeeds, and Richard III goes on to win the Battle of Bosworth in this alternate universe, killing Henry Tudor and ensuring that he never becomes Henry VII as he did in the reality. At that point, the book ends.

Reception
In 1985 Neil Gaiman reviewed The Dragon Waiting for Imagine magazine, and called it "a complex and brilliant work, serious, funny, and highly entertaining," recommending that readers buy it despite the cover art.

In 1995 Ford reported its sales as "40,000 copies in print (six thousand in hardcover) in English, about 10K more in the foreign editions".

The novel won the 1984 World Fantasy Award for Best Novel.

Jo Walton praised it as "a brilliantly written, absorbing book with great characters", lauding Ford for having convincingly portrayed "a feudal world without Christianity", and emphasizing that it is a book "written by [an American] and set in Britain (...) where the geography works and the scale of the landscape feels right."

Editions
 1983, Timescape Books, 
 1985, Avon Books,  cover by Sanjulián
 2002, Gollancz (#29 in Fantasy Masterworks line), 
 2020, Tor Books,  hardcover,  paperback, e-book.

References

External links
 Draco Concordans: A Concordance for John M. Ford's The Dragon Waiting by Andrew Plotkin
 Featured review at SF Site
 
 
 Ford interviewed about The Dragon Waiting

1983 American novels
1983 science fiction novels
American fantasy novels
American alternate history novels
Cultural depictions of Julian (emperor)
Novels by John M. Ford
Works about women in war
World Fantasy Award for Best Novel-winning works